Pitsligo Castle is a ruined castle half a mile east of Rosehearty, Aberdeenshire, Scotland. Modified in the 1570s by the Forbes of Druminnor, it was described by W. Douglas Simpson as one of the nine castles of the Knuckle, referring to the rocky headland of North-East Aberdeenshire. It is listed by Historic Environment Scotland as a scheduled monument.

History
It originated as a keep, dating to 1424. There is an arched gateway in the west wall of the outer court, with the date 1656 and the arms of the Forbeses and Erskines. In the inner court, the date is shown as 1663. The main tower had three vaulted storeys, but almost all above the lowest has disappeared. There is a stair tower at the north-east corner which is better preserved. There are several armorial plaques dotted around the castle, including the Pitsligo Arms of 1665 and, over the courtyard doorway, the Royal Arms dated 1577 and 1603.

The castle was looted and destroyed by the Flemish troops of William Lascelles in 1845. Its roof was removed by the Gardens of Troup thereafter.

As of Charles McKean's visit around 1990, "a fine walled garden" was to the north and a walled enclosure to the west. Around the same time, the castle was consolidated by Douglas Forrest architects, for Malcolm Forbes.

See also
List of castles in Scotland
Scheduled monuments in Aberdeenshire

References

External links
 Engraving of Pitsligo castle by James Fittler in the digitised copy of Scotia Depicta, or the antiquities, castles, public buildings, noblemen and gentlemen's seats, cities, towns and picturesque scenery of Scotland, 1804 at National Library of Scotland
 Pitsligo Castle Virtual Tour

Ruined castles in Aberdeenshire
Scheduled Ancient Monuments in Aberdeenshire